The Travellers were a Canadian folk singing group that formed in mid-1953. They are best known for their rendition of a Canadian version of "This Land Is Your Land" with lyrics that reference Canadian geography.

The group was formed as a result of singalongs at Camp Naivelt, a Jewish socialist vacation community that is operated by the United Jewish Peoples' Order in the village of Norval located west of Brampton, Ontario. Pete Seeger was a regular visitor to the camp and encouraged the group.

Founding members of the group were Jerry Gray (banjo and lead singer), Sid Dolgay (mando-cello), and singers Helen Gray, Jerry Goodis, and Oscar Ross. In 1961 Goodis was replaced by Ray Woodley. In 1965 they were joined by singer Joe Hampson, husband of Sharon Hampson of Sharon, Lois & Bram fame. Other members over the years include Simone Johnston, Pam Fernie, Aileen Ahern, Marty Meslin, Ted Roberts and Don Vickery.

The group, which originally considered calling itself the Beavers, started singing outside the camp at labour events and at strikes and protests.

From 1954 to 1961, Toronto musician, composer and advertising executive Samuel Goldberg was instrumental in working with the Travellers as their artistic director and agent. He enabled them to have their television debut and several appearances on CBC-TV musical programs. Goldberg was musical director on their first three albums, Across Canada with the Travellers (1958), The Travellers Sing Songs of North America (1959), and Quilting Bee (1960). In all the group produced 16 albums and performed five specials on Canadian television.

They made their debut on Canadian television in 1954 and, in 1956, achieved national exposure when they reached the finals of CBC Television's Pick the Stars contest. They performed at the first Mariposa Folk Festival in 1961. In 1962 they were invited by the Canadian government to tour the Soviet Union as part of a Canada-USSR cultural exchange performing 19 concerts. The next year they toured Canada and, in 1964, were part of a Royal Command Performance during the Queen's tour of Canada.

The group's popularity peaked during the 1960s folk revival. Canadiana songs were a major part of their repertoire at concerts during the Canadian centennial year of 1967, particularly at Expo 67.

Their repertoire included protest songs, folk songs, children's songs and international tunes.

They continued to perform at labour rallies and political events into the 1980s as well as touring schools and performing concerts for children.

Discography
Across Canada with the Travellers 1958
The Travellers Sing Songs of North America 1959
Quilting Bee 1960
Introducing the Travellers 1961
The Travellers on Tour 1962
Something to Sing About 1963
We're on Our Way Again 1964-5
Making Hay with the Travellers 1965 (Columbia Records FS 534)
The Travellers Still Travelling (in part a reissue of material previously released by Columbia)
A Century of Song 1967
This Land, the Travellers Centennial Album 1967
The Travellers Applaud Canada 1968
The Travellers Sing for Kids 1970
The Travellers 1970
Merry Go Round 1980
The Travellers 1960-1966 this land is your land 1998

Also, two songs on Sea to Sea and one on The Children's Collection, Vol 1

References

External links

 
 Article at thecanadianencyclopedia.ca

Canadian folk music groups
Musical groups established in 1953